Barbucca is a genus of loaches native to Southeast Asia. It is currently the only genus in its family.

Species
There are currently two recognized species in this genus:
 Barbucca diabolica T. R. Roberts, 1989
 Barbucca elongata Vasil'eva & Vasil'ev, 2013

References

Barbuccidae